WAAA may refer to:

 Women's Amateur Athletic Association, former governing body of athletics for women in England
 Wiltshire Air Ambulance Appeal, a charity that raises money for the Wiltshire Air Ambulance
 We Are America Alliance, a national alliance of immigrant rights organizations and allies in the United States
 WAAA-LD, a low-power television station (channel 16, virtual 49) licensed to serve Valparaiso, Indiana, United States
 WTOB (AM), a radio station (980 AM) licensed to Winston-Salem, North Carolina, United States, which used the call sign WAAA until June 2006
 WKZL, a radio station (107.5 FM) licensed to Winston-Salem, North Carolina, which once used the call sign WAAA-FM
 the ICAO code for Sultan Hasanuddin International Airport
 Lipid IVA 3-deoxy-D-manno-octulosonic acid transferase, an enzyme
 (KDO)2-lipid IVA (2-8) 3-deoxy-D-manno-octulosonic acid transferase
 (KDO)3-lipid IVA (2-4) 3-deoxy-D-manno-octulosonic acid transferase